Au Ha is a Hakka village in northern New Territories in Hong Kong. Au Ha is located on the south side of Sha Tau Kok Road (Wo Hang Section) between Fanling and Sha Tau Kok, north of Sheung Wo Hang and west of Ha Wo Hang. Its name means "below the mountain pass" in Cantonese.

Administration
Au Ha is a recognized village under the New Territories Small House Policy. It is one of the villages represented within the Sha Tau Kok District Rural Committee. For electoral purposes, Au Ha is part of the Sha Ta constituency, which is currently represented by Ko Wai-kei.

History
The villages of Ma Tseuk Leng (upper and lower), Yim Tso Ha, Wu Shek Kok and Au Ha formed a yeuk (a form of oath-sworn, inter-village, mutual-aid alliance.

See also
 Sha Tau Kok Railway

References

External links
 Delineation of area of existing village Au Ha (Sha Tau Kok) for election of resident representative (2019 to 2022)

Villages in North District, Hong Kong
Sha Tau Kok